Trichloris is a genus of New World plants in the grass family.

 Species
 Trichloris crinita (Lag.) Parodi - United States (Arizona, New Mexico, Texas), northern Mexico (Baja California Sur, Sonora, Chihuahua, Durango, Coahuila, San Luis Potosí), South America (Bolivia, Peru, Argentina, Paraguay, Uruguay, Chile) 
 Trichloris pluriflora E.Fourn. - Texas, Mexico, Guatemala, Cuba, Venezuela, Colombia, Ecuador, Peru, Bolivia, Paraguay, northern Argentina

References

Chloridoideae
Poaceae genera